Lolita Lagrosas (born 24 August 1938) is a Filipino athlete. She competed in the women's long jump and the women's high jump at the 1964 Summer Olympics.

References

1938 births
Living people
Athletes (track and field) at the 1964 Summer Olympics
Athletes (track and field) at the 1968 Summer Olympics
Filipino female long jumpers
Filipino female high jumpers
Filipino pentathletes
Olympic track and field athletes of the Philippines
Place of birth missing (living people)
Asian Games medalists in athletics (track and field)
Asian Games silver medalists for the Philippines
Asian Games bronze medalists for the Philippines
Athletes (track and field) at the 1958 Asian Games
Athletes (track and field) at the 1966 Asian Games
Athletes (track and field) at the 1970 Asian Games
Medalists at the 1958 Asian Games
Medalists at the 1966 Asian Games
Medalists at the 1970 Asian Games